In mathematics, the following matrix was given by Indian mathematician Brahmagupta:

It satisfies

Powers of the matrix are defined by

The Brahmagupta matrices can be extended to negative integers:

See also
Brahmagupta's identity
Brahmagupta's function

References

External links
 Eric Weisstein. Brahmagupta Matrix, MathWorld, 1999.

Brahmagupta
Matrices